"Way Down" is a 1977 song by Elvis Presley.

Way Down may also refer to:

 Way Down (album), by Curtis Amy, 1962
 "Way Down", a song by Modest Mouse from the 1997 album The Fruit That Ate Itself
 "Way Down", a song by Ocean Alley from the 2020 album Lonely Diamond
 "Way Down", a song by MØ from the 2018 album Forever Neverland

Other uses
 The Vault (2021 film), a Spanish action thriller film also known by the title Way Down

See also
 
 Lay Down (disambiguation)